The Bill is a British police procedural television series that ran from 1984 to 2010. The show, whose name is derived from "old bill"—a British slang term for police officers—was unusual among police dramas in that it focused on the lives and work of one shift of police officers, rather than on any particular aspect of police work. The series originated in 1983 as a one-off drama titled Woodentop (another British slang term for the police, derived from the helmets worn by British police officers), written by Geoff McQueen and produced by Thames Television. ITV were sufficiently impressed with Woodentop that they commissioned a series, which started in 1984 under the title of The Bill. At the time of the series' end in August 2010, The Bill was the United Kingdom's longest-running police drama and was among the longest-running of any British television series, having run for almost 27 years.

The Bill has earned various awards and nominations during its run, with the nominations in categories ranging from Best Drama to its camera and editing work to the cast's acting performance. It received nominations for eight awards from the British Academy of Film and Television Arts, winning Best Video Cameraman in 1990 and Best Continuing Drama in 2009—an award for which it was unsuccessfully nominated in a further three years. In addition, The Bill enjoyed success at the Inside Soap Awards, where it won Best Drama six times, including four consecutive wins, as well as a nomination in 2010—losing to Waterloo Road. Other awards include a Writers' Guild of Great Britain award for Best Soap/Continuing Drama Series in 2008, Best Serial Drama at the Digital Spy Soap Awards of the same year and a nomination for Most Popular Overseas Drama at the 2005 Logie Awards. The Bill has also received multiple nominations at the EMMAs, National Television Awards, where it won Most Popular Drama in 1996 and 2004, and six Royal Television Society award nominations, having won awards in 2006 and 2008.

Awards and nominations

British Academy of Film and Television Arts awards

Ethnic Multicultural Media Academy Awards

National Television Awards

Royal Television Society Awards

Inside Soap Awards

Other

References

External links

Awards and nominations
awards and nominations
Lists of awards by television series